Kornelia Ender (later Matthes now Grummt, born 25 October 1958) is a former East German swimmer who at the 1976 Summer Olympics became the first woman swimmer to win four gold medals at a single Olympic Games, all in world record times. It was later proven that the East German team doctors had systematically administered steroids to their athletes (albeit without the athletes' knowledge). As she had exhibited symptoms of steroid use in 1976 (deep voice, overdeveloped body), strong suspicion was cast on the validity of Ender's accomplishments.

Ender trained from a young age and won her first Olympic medals as a 13-year-old at the 1972 Olympics in Munich: three silver medals, including one in the 200 m individual medley, finishing behind Australia's Shane Gould.  Over the following years she broke 32 world records in individual events, including the four at the Montreal Games.  In 1991, she addressed the long-held suspicions about her physical condition at the 1976 Games, acknowledging that team doctors and coaches had given her numerous injections of drugs over the preceding months (cf.
doping in East Germany).  Ender said that she did not know at the time, nor had she ever subsequently found out, exactly what the drugs were.  She said she was told only that the drugs would help her "regenerate and recuperate" and therefore, although she was surprised by the muscle mass she added, she nonetheless attributed it simply to her rigorous training.

When she became suspicious and refused to take chlorodehydromethyltestosterone in 1977 she was banned from the team by Manfred Ewald.

Ender was married for four years to East German backstroke swimmer and multiple Olympic champion Roland Matthes. She is now married to former East German track and field athlete and bobsledder Steffen Grummt.

See also
 List of members of the International Swimming Hall of Fame
 List of multiple Olympic gold medalists
 List of multiple Summer Olympic medalists

References

Lord, Craig (26 March 2004). Olympic heroes. Times Online

1958 births
Living people
People from Plauen
People from Bezirk Karl-Marx-Stadt
East German female swimmers
Sportspeople from Saxony
Olympic swimmers of East Germany
East German female freestyle swimmers
East German female butterfly swimmers
East German female medley swimmers
Swimmers at the 1972 Summer Olympics
Swimmers at the 1976 Summer Olympics
Olympic gold medalists for East Germany
Olympic silver medalists for East Germany
World record setters in swimming
Medalists at the 1972 Summer Olympics
Medalists at the 1976 Summer Olympics
World Aquatics Championships medalists in swimming
European Aquatics Championships medalists in swimming
Olympic gold medalists in swimming
Olympic silver medalists in swimming
Doping cases in swimming
German sportspeople in doping cases
Recipients of the Patriotic Order of Merit in gold